Mrs Dale's Diary  was the first significant BBC radio serial drama.  It was first broadcast on 5 January 1948 on the BBC Light Programme, later BBC Radio 2; it ran until 25 April 1969.  A new episode was broadcast each weekday afternoon, with a repeat the following morning.  A few days after the final episode, a new serial drama, Waggoners' Walk, took over the time slot.

The main scriptwriter for many years was Jonquil Antony, and her first collaborator (under a pseudonym)
was Ted Willis, later to create Dixon of Dock Green.

The lead character, Mrs Dale, was played by Ellis Powell until she was dismissed in controversial circumstances in 1963 and replaced by Jessie Matthews.

Format 
An innovative characteristic of the programme was that a brief introductory narrative in each episode was spoken by Mrs Dale as if she were writing her diary.

The serial centred on Mrs Mary Dale, a doctor's wife, and her husband Jim, and the comings and goings of a middle class society. The Dales lived at Virginia Lodge in the fictional London Metro-land-style suburb of Parkwood Hill. They had moved there from the real area of Kenton, which straddles the border between the London boroughs of Brent and Harrow. Later in the series, to modernise the programme and its setting, the producers relocated the family in the fictional new town of Exton New Town.

Mrs Dale's mother was Mrs Rosemary Freeman, whom Jim always called, rather gravely, "mother-in-law". Dr and Mrs Dale had a daughter, Gwen, and a son, Bob, who worked in the motor trade. He was married to Jenny; they had twins. Gwen was widowed after her husband David was killed in a water-skiing accident in the Bahamas where he was holidaying with his rich mistress. Mary Dale's sister, Sally, (which she always pronounced "Selly") lived in Chelsea and moved in exotic circles. The Dales and their friends (along with Captain, Mrs Freeman's cat, apparently named after the rank of her late husband, who had been killed in the First World War) got along in almost perfect harmony. It was all respectable, comfortable and middle-class.

Treatment of homosexuality

The programme is thought to be the first British mainstream drama which depicted a character known to be homosexual sympathetically in a leading part – Richard Fulton (portrayed by David March), Sally's husband. It was a brave move to feature a gay man, especially when homosexuality was still illegal in the United Kingdom. Clearly the programme's makers considered the time was right for the subject to be featured. Richard Fulton, however, was an odd character to use, in several ways. Not least is that (though apparently based on the homosexual writer Patrick White) Richard's history in the serial was heterosexual. He was in fact a character who had developed a lot, having been presented in the early days as  a monster of petulance.

Changes to the format 
On 26 February 1962, the serial was renamed The Dales. The linking narratives by Mrs Dale were dropped. The reason was that the BBC was conscious that the series was considered by the media to be twee and hopelessly old fashioned. The changes included a new theme tune composed by Ron Grainer, composer of the theme music for Doctor Who. "Dance in the Twilight" from Eric Coates' Springtime Suite also served as a signature tune for a time.

In 1975, Matthews's biographer, Michael Thornton, wrote:
On 19 February, 1963, a plump and embittered fifty-six-year-old character actress called Ellis Powell walked out of Broadcasting House for the last time. She was not a star. In fact, she had earned less than £30 a week. But her voice was as well known in Britain as that of Queen Elizabeth II, for it was heard twice a day by seven million devoted listeners.  Miss Powell was Britain's most sacrosanct fictional paragon, Mrs. Dale, in the radio serial Mrs. Dale's Diary. And now, after fifteen years in the role she had created, the BBC had summarily fired her partly because of her drinking habits, and partly because it was felt that the role, and also the entire programme, was in need of a facelift. Three months later, at the age of fifty-seven, she died. Her friends believed she never recovered from the shock and distress of her summary dismissal by the BBC. In the last weeks of her life she worked as a demonstrator at the Ideal Home Exhibition and as a cleaner in an hotel.

The Dales
In its last years, The Dales became more sensational. Mrs Dale became a councillor, a position she had to give up after she had caused a man's death by careless driving. A heart attack forced Dr Dale to retire from practice. Perhaps the most famous storyline was Jenny's getting measles; listeners wrote in thousands complaining that she had already had measles in 1949.

When it became The Dales, the show did try to copy The Archers, which was originally a medium to disseminate information to the agricultural community, and to give an insight into rural affairs to the public. In The Dales the plots now revolved around medical conditions and problems. When the series ran a story about the importance of women having regular cervical smear tests and checking their breasts for lumps, the junior health minister praised the programme, saying it had encouraged thousands of women to see their doctor.

The serial ran for 5,531 episodes, culminating with the engagement of Mrs Dale's daughter Gwen to a famous TV professor on 25 April 1969. On news of its demise, Liberal MP Peter Bessell attempted to introduce a reprieve for the series in Parliament. The BBC Sound Archive holds only five complete episodes of Mrs Dale's Diary, and seven complete episodes of The Dales.

Spin-offs
Over the years it ran there were a number of books written around the characters, several authored in whole or part by Jonquil Antony, the most important scriptwriter at the beginning and for many years. In 1970, the year after the programme finished, she took back her former characters after a fashion, publishing Dear Dr. Dale, a novel set after the end of the serial.

In the same year Charles Simon, who had played Dr Dale in the Jessie Matthews years, did his own continuation of the story, going on tour in At Home With The Dales. This show has its place in theatre history as the first professional venture of Cameron Mackintosh, later renowned for large-scale musicals. The Dales play was written by Charles Henry, who was soon discovered to be the versatile and experienced Charles Simon. Later dates in the tour were cancelled because the audience did not seem to be there. "It would have been different if Jessie had done the tour" Charles Simon remarked a few months later (to actor Roger Sansom, with whom he was in a broadcast). He was, however, the only member of the radio cast to make the transition.

The play was published, but has seldom been revived. In 1972 it received an amateur production at Rugby Theatre, with Bridget Watson as Mrs Dale and Harry Roberts as her husband the doctor. The only professional revival seems to have been in 1997 at the Kenneth More Studio Theatre in Ilford, when Angela Ellis and Roger Braban played the senior Dales.

Catchphrase

The phrase seized on by caricaturists as typical of Mrs Dale's narrative was "I'm rather worried about Jim..."  Indeed, the phrase was a staple of many comedy programmes, radio and television, in the early 1960s aiming to poke fun at safe, staid and undemanding middle-class lifestyles. The last episode ended with Mrs Dale saying, "There's one thing that won't change – I shall always worry about Jim..."

Parodies

Mrs Wilson's Diary

Mrs Dale's Diary was the basis of Mrs Wilson's Diary in the fortnightly satirical magazine Private Eye. The writers (primarily John Wells) presented Mrs Wilson as seeing herself as comfortably middle class, in contrast to the working class pretensions (and middle class actuality) of her husband, for example the Wincarnis (a brand of tonic wine) and the worsted suits with two pairs of trousers (Wilson was from Huddersfield, a town known for the manufacture of worsted cloth).

The Goon Show

The show was mentioned in the following episodes of The Goon Show:
 In an untitled episode (s02 e01 - 22 January 1952), listeners are given an example of how Mrs Dale's Diary would sound as produced by Americans.  It includes over-hyped music, multiple in-show advertisements for bizarrely named products, and ends with several murders.
 In The Man Who Tried To Destroy London's Monuments, (s04 ep02 - 9 October 1953), Eccles regains consciousness and is told he is in Mrs Dale's Diary.
 Nineteen Eighty-Five, (s05 ep15 - 5 January 1955),  in which mention is made of Mrs Dale's Real Diary when the character Bluebottle is reading a book:
Seagoon:  I want to read it. What's it called?
Bluebottle: It's called Mrs Dale's Real Diary.
Seagoon: Mrs Dale's...?? Heavens -- would the BBC stop at nothing? So this was how they kept the masses from thinking.
Bluebottle: Eheehee! Look at this page! Eheehee! It's a Three-D picture of Mrs Dale in her nightshirt being chased by Richard Dimbleby... Eheehee! Eheeheehee! Eheeheeoooooughhhh... pauses to wipe drool off chin.

It was also one of the recordings used for torture in the BBC Listening Room, that episode's parody of Room 101.

 The History of Pliny the Elder (s07 ep25 - 28 March 1957):

Seagoon:  Fear not! We shall fight them up hill and down Mrs Dale!

Round the Horne

 The programme was often a 'target' (albeit an affectionate one) on the BBC Radio comedy Round the Horne, referred to as "Mrs Dire's Dreary", with the part of Mrs Dire being played by Kenneth Williams.

References

External links
Mrs Dale's Diary at Whirligig

Published references 

 Mrs Dale's Diary: Gwen's Love Story (No writer given) Pub:Chambers, 1951
 BBC Year Book For 1952  Pub: British Broadcasting Corporation 1951
Mrs Dale At Home Jonquil Antony   Pub: Macdonald, London, 1952
 Mrs Dale Jonquil Antony & Robert Turley   Pub: The World's Work 1958
 The Dales of Parkwood Hill Jonquil Antony & Robert Turley  Pub: The World's Work 1959
 Mrs Dale's Friendship Book Jonquil Antony   Pub: Arlington Books 1961
 The Dales Rex Edwards  Pub: British Broadcasting Corporation 1969
 Dear Dr Dale Jonquil Antony  Pub: Corgi 1970
 Pulling Faces For A Living  James Dale  Pub: Victor Gollancz 1970
 At Home With The Dales Charles Simon  Pub: Samuel French 1971
 Evening All: Fifty Years Over A Hot Typewriter Ted Willis  Pub: Macmillan 1991
 Broadcasting It Keith Howes  Pub: Cassell 1993

British radio soap operas
Fictional diaries
1948 radio programme debuts
1969 radio programme endings
BBC Radio 2 programmes
BBC Light Programme programmes
Medicine and health in fiction